Pa' quererte is a Colombian telenovela produced and distributed by RCN Televisión that premiered on RCN Televisión on 7 January 2020. The series is an adaptation of the Mexican telenovela Papá a toda madre broadcast on Las Estrellas in 2018. It stars an ensemble cast headed by Sebastián Martínez, Laura de León, Luis Eduardo Arango, and Diana Wiswell. The plot revolves around 4 friends of different ages football fans who have a small team, in addition to this the 4 are non-conventional parents who will have to assume their role as parents. It will air Monday to Friday at 8:00 p.m., replacing El man es Germán.

Due to the COVID-19 pandemic in Colombia, RCN Televisión temporarily suspended the telenovela, broadcasting the last episode on 20 March 2020. This, because production has not ended, and quarantine has been decreed. New episodes resumed on 12 January 2021.

Cast

Main 
 Sebastián Martínez as Mauricio Reina 
 Juliette Pardau as Daniela "Dany" Daza
 Hanny Viscaíno as Isabel Reina Trujillo
 Carlos Camacho as Antonio "Toño" José Perdomo
 Cecilia Navia as Verónica Valencia
 Luis Eduardo Arango as Octavio Victoria
 Laura de León as Azucena Tinoco
 Manuel Sarmiento as Jorge Morales
 Diana Wiswell as Catalina Vengoechea
 Juliana Velásquez as Tatiana Perdomo Valencia
 Carlos Andrés Ramírez as Jerónimo Perdomo Valencia
 Camila Jurado as Juliana Morales Vengoechea
 Alejandra Ávila as Milagros Victoria Mora
 Variel Sánchez as Lorenzo Ríos
 Juliana Galvis as Lola
 Alina Lozano as Elvira Mora

Recurring 
 Mónica Pardo as María Trujillo
 Juan Manuel Lenis as Fabián Vélez
 Luces Velásquez as Consuelo Daza
 Patrick Delmas as Alberto Sotillo
 Ana María Medina as Miranda

Television rating 

 

| link2            = List of Pa' quererte episodes#Season 2 (2021)
| timeslot2        = MonFri 8:00pm
| episodes2        = 81
| start2           = 
| startrating2     = 8.6
| end2             = 
| endrating2       = 10.1
| viewers2         = |2}} 
}}

Web series 

Pa' quererte en casa is a web series that premiered its first season on 30 April 2020 and ended on 2 July 2020. The season features a special for Father's Day, and it tells stories in parallel to the original story of how several of the characters and protagonists of the telenovela live during the COVID-19 pandemic. It was created for the reason of suspension of the filming of the telenovela, due to the pandemic.

Episodes

Season 1 (2020)

Season 2 (2020–21)

Notes

References 

Colombian telenovelas
RCN Televisión telenovelas
Spanish-language television shows
Spanish-language telenovelas
2020 telenovelas
2020 Colombian television series debuts
Television productions suspended due to the COVID-19 pandemic
2021 Colombian television series endings
2021 telenovelas